Francis Wurtz (born 3 January 1948 in Strasbourg) is a former French Member of the European Parliament, serving from 1979 until 2009. Elected in the Île-de-France constituency on the French Communist Party (PCF) ticket, he sat with the European United Left - Nordic Green Left (GUE/NGL) group, and was its President. He was nominated by GUE/NGL as their candidate for President of the European Parliament in the 2004 election, where he received 51 votes.

A university graduate in literature (philosophy), he worked for a time as a State school teacher. He has been a member of the central committee of the PCF since 1979.

External links
 Francis Wurtz' website

1948 births
Living people
Politicians from Strasbourg
MEPs for Île-de-France 2004–2009
French Communist Party MEPs
MEPs for France 1979–1984
MEPs for France 1984–1989
MEPs for France 1989–1994
MEPs for France 1994–1999
MEPs for France 1999–2004